Shabri is a 2011 Indian Hindi-language action film directed by Lalit Marathe and produced by Ram Gopal Varma. It is about a woman, played by Ishaa Koppikar, who becomes the first female crime lady in Mumbai. The film was completed in 2005 and was showcased as the opening film at the Rome Film Festival, and was also premiered at the New York Asian Film Festival. The film was officially released worldwide on 26 August 2011.

Plot
The film starts with accidental death of Kisnya (younger brother of the villain), who insists that Shabri be handed over to Police for the murder of Inspector Khare, which Murad (a friendly neighbor of Shabri family who is a bookie)  forcefully opposes. Shabri is guilty of murder of a wicked police inspector (Khare) who tried to rape her in police station in front of her younger brother who has already been tortured by Khare.
After killing Kisnya, Murad and Shabri (now both murderers) run away from Mumbai to a farmhouse uptown, but are nevertheless traced by Rajdar bhau's gang (who is even helped by a corrupt officer named Inspector Kadam). There is a shoot out. Murad gets shot and is captured by the gang (he is later put to death with two dozen bullets by an angry Rajdhar Bhau, who wants to avenge Kisnya's death). Shabri is taken to Kadam's flat where the drunk officer tries to rape her but Shabri again somehow manages to run away after shooting Kadam in foot and breaking a bottle of beer on his head.

Now another friend of the late Murad namely Vilas helps her. Here an interesting character, Irfan Kazi enters the story, interesting because it is not possible to make out if he is good or evil. Nevertheless, he is an encounter cop who is fed up with killing criminals and wishes to do something more creative for his own entertainment. He does this by giving Shabri inside knowhow of Rajdar Bhau's gang where unknown to the egotist Rajdar almost every one, by now fed up with selfishness of their boss, is standing on brink of rebellion. In the climax, Shabri at last comes face to face with Rajdar bhau and he is shocked to learn that Shabri is not there to beg for mercy but to kill him. Each gangster standing around them are now friends of Shabri and ready to kill Rajdar at her signal - their guns are pointed at Rajdar bhau (using her leadership qualities and Kazi's contacts she has convinced all of them that their future and well being is now in getting rid of Rajdar bhau and reorganizing under Shabri's being their chief under whom they will all work as equal partners ). Rajdar Bhau, with Shabri's approval shoots himself.

Cast

Trivia
 Ishaa Koppikar's make-up was so convincing that security and producers wouldn't let her enter the set, as they didn't recognize her.

References

External links
 

2010s Hindi-language films
2011 action films
Indian action films
2011 films
Reliance Entertainment films
Hindi-language action films